Percy Purcell (18 May 1911 – 13 May 1994) was an Australian rules footballer who played with North Melbourne in the Victorian Football League (VFL).

Purcell later served in the Royal Australian Air Force during World War II.

Notes

External links 

1911 births
1994 deaths
Australian rules footballers from Victoria (Australia)
North Melbourne Football Club players